RIAS (Radio in the American Sector) was a radio and television station in the American Sector of Berlin during the Cold War. It was founded by the US occupational authorities after World War II in 1946 to provide the German population in and around Berlin with news and political reporting.

History

By the end of 1945 the US military administration in Allied-occupied Berlin decided to establish its own broadcasting system, after the Soviets had refused to provide air time on the Berliner Rundfunk radio station. Supervised by the US Information Control Division, broadcasting commenced on 7 February 1946. For the first months the programme could be distributed via telephone line only (as DIAS – Drahtfunk im amerikanischen Sektor), until a first medium wave transmitter was installed in September.

By its creative and innovative programming, the station quickly gained much popularity. Its importance was magnified during the Berlin Blockade in 1948-49, when it carried the message of Allied determination to resist Soviet intimidation. At the same time, the RIAS Symphony Orchestra under chief conductor Ferenc Fricsay (still existing as the Deutsches Symphonie-Orchester Berlin) and a professional chamber choir, the Rundfunkchor des RIAS (present-day RIAS Kammerchor) were also established by the US forces; together with the RIAS Dance Orchestra and the RIAS Big Band, they largely contributed to the station's entertainment programme under the editorship of the former Berliner Rundfunk employee Hans Rosenthal.

After the Berlin blockade, RIAS (by now carried on terrestrial medium wave and later FM transmitters) evolved into a surrogate home service for East Germans, as it broadcast news, commentary, and cultural programs that were unavailable in the controlled media of the German Democratic Republic. By own account "a free voice of the free world", the station aired the chime of the Freedom Bell each Sunday at noon, followed by an excerpt from the text of the "Declaration of Freedom". Listening to it in Soviet-controlled East Germany was discouraged. After the workers' riots in East Germany in 1953, which were the end result of the government's raising of food prices and factory production quotas, the Communist government blamed the incident on RIAS and the CIA.

Eventually RIAS was jointly funded and managed by the United States and West Germany. Under the supervision of the United States Information Agency from 1965, the station was staffed almost entirely with German employees, who worked under a small American management team. It maintained a large research component during the Cold War, and interviewed travellers from East Germany and compiled material from the East German Communist media, and broadcast programs for specific groups in East Germany, such as youths, women, farmers, even border guards. RIAS had a huge audience in East Germany and was the most popular foreign radio service. This audience began to shrink only when West German television became widely available to viewers in East Germany. A second radio programme, then called RIAS 2, was launched in 1953; it was remodelled as a youth radio station from 1985.

Television 

RIAS-TV, began broadcasting (as a part-time optout on the terrestrial frequency of SAT.1) from West Berlin in August 1988, which also acquired the German Educational Television Network in United States. Prior to this there were no Western television broadcasts specifically targeted at East Germany, although many of the domestic West German TV networks (particularly ARD) had high power transmitters along the border and could be received throughout most of East where many of their programmes attracted a larger audience than the official East German domestic broadcasters.

The fall of the Berlin Wall in 1989 and German reunification the following year meant that RIAS-TV would be short lived. In 1992 Deutsche Welle (Germany's International broadcaster) inherited the RIAS-TV broadcast facilities, using them to start a German, English and Spanish language television channel broadcast via satellite.

Transmitters
The station's most important transmitter was at Berlin-Britz (on 612 kHz). Later a second transmitter at Hof in Bavaria was added to improve reception in the southern parts of East Germany (on 684 kHz), which was switched on at sunset to cover Germany with sky wave. In addition to medium wave, the station also transmitted on shortwave on a frequency of 6005 KHz. The Hof facility was closed and carted off to Mühlacker in 1994, though the Berlin-Britz facility remained in service until 2013, transmitting the programmes of Deutschlandradio Kultur; it was finally dismantled in 2015.

See also 
 Radio Free Europe
 Voice of America
 Broadcasting in East Germany
 Deutscher Fernsehfunk, the East German television organisation also known as Fernsehen der DDR
 Rundfunk der DDR, the East German radio organisation

References 

Cold War history of Germany
Defunct radio stations in Germany
Defunct television channels in Germany
Allied occupation of Germany
Germany–United States relations
Mass media in Berlin
Radio stations established in 1946
Radio stations disestablished in 1993
Television channels and stations established in 1988
Television channels and stations disestablished in 1993